The modern Olympic Games were founded by French historian Pierre de Coubertin, and France has competed in every edition (both Summer and Winter), with the possible exception of the 1904 Games (as sources disagree about whether athlete Albert Corey competed for the United States or France).

French athletes have won 751 medals at the Summer Olympic Games in a wide variety of sports, achieving particular success in fencing and cycling. France has won an additional 138 medals at the Winter Olympic Games, mostly in alpine skiing.

Hosted Games 

France has hosted the Olympic games on five occasions and is planning to host the sixth: the 1900 Summer Olympics in Paris, the 1924 Winter Olympics in Chamonix, the 1924 Summer Olympics in Paris, the 1968 Winter Olympics in Grenoble, the 1992 Winter Olympics in Albertville  and the 2024 Summer Olympics in Paris.

Overview of Olympic participation

France at the Summer Olympics

France at the Winter Olympics

Medals by summer sport 
<div style="font-size:90%;">

Medals by winter sport 

<div style="font-size:90%;">

Summary by sport

Aquatics

Swimming

France first competed in swimming at the Paris 1900 Games, with 47 swimmers taking one gold medal (and five total medals).

Archery

France competed in archery in its first Olympic appearance in Paris 1900. The French team there took 13 of the 20 medals, including gold in 4 of the 7 events.

Athletics

France first competed in athletics at the inaugural 1896 Games, winning a silver and a bronze. The nation's first gold medal in the sport is a disputed one; Michel Théato was Luxembourgish but living in Paris; his win in the 1900 marathon is credited to France by the International Olympic Committee, which rejected a petition by Luxembourg to change the Olympic record of Théato's nationality.

Basque pelota

In the only appearance of basque pelota as a medal sport at the Olympics in 1900, the French team (one of only two teams to enter) withdrew shortly before the competition started, and the match was not played. The Spanish pair is credited with the gold medal.

Cricket

France is one of two nations to have competed in the only Olympic cricket competition, in 1900. The French team lost to a British team, taking second place.

Croquet

France was the only nation to compete in the only Olympic croquet competitions, in 1900.

Cycling

France first competed in cycling in 1896, winning four of the six cycling events—all of the events which France contested. France has won more gold medals (41) and total medals (91) in the sport than any other nation.

Equestrian

France has won the third-most gold medals and fourth-most total medals in equestrian sports. The nation hosted the first equestrian events in Paris 1900, winning gold medals in two of the five events.

Fencing

France has won the second-most gold medals and second-most total medals in fencing, in each case behind Italy.

Football

France competed in the first men's Olympic football "tournament," winning one match and losing another to earn a second place finish currently recognized as a silver medal performance. The nation was a frequent competitor from then through 1996, peaking with a gold medal win in 1984. France did not qualify for the men's tournament from 2000 to 2016, but has qualified for the 2020 Games.

France did not qualify for the first four women's tournaments from 1996 to 2008. The French women debuted in 2012, placing 4th, and followed that with a 5th-place finish in 2016.

Golf

France competed in the first Olympic golf tournaments in 1900, which the nation hosted. The French golfers' best results that year were 4th place for the women and 10th place for the men. France did not compete in the 1904 golf tournaments. When the sport returned to the Olympics in 2016, France had two men and two women compete; the best result was Grégory Bourdy's 21st-place finish.

Gymnastics

France had one gymnast participate in one event in the inaugural 1896 Games. The nation's first medals in the sport came when Paris hosted the Games in 1900; the only event on the schedule was the men's individual all-around, in which France swept the top 18 places (having 108 of the 135 competing gymnasts).

Polo

France competed at two of the five editions of Olympic polo tournaments, both occasions when Paris hosted the Games in 1900 and 1924. The nation is formally credited with no medals, though French players competed on a mixed team in 1900 (along with a British player) that took bronze. France had a fully-French team as well in 1900, which took fifth place. Both the all-French and the mixed team went 0–1 (losing to the same team), with the mixed team placed higher due to a bye. The French team in 1924 went 0–4 in the round-robin tournament. Thus, the overall Olympic record of teams with French polo players is 0–6.

Rowing

France hosted the inaugural Olympic rowing contests in Paris 1900. France won 2 of the 5 gold medals, and a French boy served as cox in the final for the otherwise Dutch team that won the coxed pair.

Rugby

France hosted the inaugural Olympic rugby union contest in 1900, winning the gold medal over Germany and Great Britain. France did not play in 1908, but returned in 1920 (losing the single match to the United States) and 1924 (beating Romania but losing again to the United States).

With the return of rugby, in the form of rugby sevens, in 2016, France competed again. France had both men's and women's teams in 2016; both advanced out of pool play to the quarterfinals but were defeated there.

Sailing

France hosted the first Olympic sailing competitions in 1900, earning 24 total medals in the 13 events, including 5 golds.

Shooting

France competed in shooting at the inaugural 1896 Games, with one shooter in one event, winning no medals. The nation's first medals came when France hosted the Games in 1900, with 3 golds and 10 total medals that year.

Tennis

France first competed in tennis at the inaugural 1896 Games, with one player competing in men's singles and losing in the first round.

See also
 List of flag bearers for France at the Olympics
 :Category:Olympic competitors for France
 France at the Paralympics
 List of Olympic female gymnasts for France

References

External links